Herreid is a city in Campbell County, South Dakota, United States. The population was 416 at the 2020 census.

Herreid was laid out in 1901 when a branch of the Soo Line reached the city, and named after Charles N. Herreid, fourth Governor of South Dakota.

Geography

Herreid has been assigned the ZIP code 57632 and the FIPS place code 28340. U.S. Route 83 is the main thoroughfare, running from north to south through the town.

Demographics

2010 census
As of the census of 2010, there were 438 people, 213 households, and 115 families residing in the city. The racial makeup of the city was 97.5% White, 0.2% African American, 0.7% Native American, 0.2% Asian, and 1.4% from two or more races. Hispanic or Latino of any race were 2.5% of the population.

There were 213 households, of which 20.7% had children under the age of 18 living with them, 49.3% were married couples living together, 3.8% had a female householder with no husband present, 0.9% had a male householder with no wife present, and 46.0% were non-families. 40.4% of all households were made up of individuals, and 24.4% had someone living alone who was 65 years of age or older. The average household size was 2.06 and the average family size was 2.76.

The median age in the city was 49.3 years. 19.9% of residents were under the age of 18; 3.7% were between the ages of 18 and 24; 18.9% were from 25 to 44; 29.2% were from 45 to 64; and 28.3% were 65 years of age or older. The gender makeup of the city was 45.9% male and 54.1% female.

2000 census
As of the 2000 census, there were 482 people, 207 households, and 137 families residing in the city. The population density was 356.3 people per square mile (137.9/km2). There were 234 housing units at an average density of 173.0 per square mile (66.9/km2). The racial makeup of the city was 99.59% White and 0.41% Native American.

There were 207 households, out of which 26.6% had children under the age of 18 living with them, 61.4% were married couples living together, 2.9% had a female householder with no husband present, and 33.8% were non-families. 32.9% of all households were made up of individuals, and 19.3% had someone living alone who was 65 years of age or older. The average household size was 2.33 and the average family size was 2.99.

In the city, the population was spread out, with 25.5% under the age of 18, 2.5% from 18 to 24, 25.9% from 25 to 44, 20.1% from 45 to 64, and 25.9% who were 65 years of age or older. The median age was 42 years. For every 100 females, there were 101.7 males. For every 100 females age 18 and over, there were 99.4 males.

The median income for a household in the city was $29,444, and the median income for a family was $40,000. Males had a median income of $25,556 versus $16,375 for females. The per capita income for the city was $15,287. About 8.5% of families and 9.2% of the population were below the poverty line, including 1.5% of those under age 18 and 23.6% of those age 65 or over.

External links
 U.S. Census map of Herreid

References

Cities in Campbell County, South Dakota
Cities in South Dakota